Nantewlaeth Colliery Halt railway station served Nantewlaeth Colliery, located in the village of Glyncorrwg, in the historical county of Glamorganshire, Wales, from 1940 to 1955 on the South Wales Mineral Railway.

History 
The station was opened on 28 October 1940 by the Great Western Railway. It was only open to miners. The last train was shown in the timetable on 18 September 1955. The track was removed in 1966.

References

External links 

Disused railway stations in Neath Port Talbot
Former Great Western Railway stations
Railway stations in Great Britain opened in 1940
Railway stations in Great Britain closed in 1955
1940 establishments in Wales
1955 disestablishments in Wales